New Land or variant may refer to:

 The New Land, a 1972 Swedish film
 The New Land (1924 film), a German film
 The New Land (TV series), a 1974 American dramatic series
 New Land (magazine), an Australian magazine 
 New Land (novel), a 1933 children's book by Sarah Lindsay Schmidt
 "New Land" (song), by Avatar, 2017
 New Lands, a 1923 book by Charles Fort
 "New Lands" (song), a 2012 single by Justice
 Novaya Zemlya (English: New Land), a Russian archipelago in the Arctic Ocean
 Uusimaa (English: New Land), a Finnish region in the Southern Finland

See also
New states (disambiguation)
New Country (disambiguation)
Newland (disambiguation)
Newlands (disambiguation)